The 3rd season of the National Cheerleading Championships was held at PhilSports Arena, Pasig, Philippines on March 9, 2008.

Finals

Qualifiers 

High School Division

Legend:

College Division

Legend:

National Cheerleading Championship
Sports in the Philippines
2008 in Philippine sport